The Oran Tramway (in ) is a system of public transport in Oran (also transliterated as Wahrān), the second largest city in Algeria. The first section includes  of track and 32 stops. Its commissioning was delayed several times but took place on 1 May 2013.

History 

The project started in 2008.  In 2011, the first tram was brought from Barcelona. On 20 February 2012, the first technical test was carried out on a  track. On 2 March 2012, the non-commercial operation started for a two-month period. In May 2013, the Oran Tramway was officially opened by the Minister of Transport, and was opened for commercial use the following day.

Route 

This line serves in particular: Sidi Maârouf, Haï Sabah, the campus of the University of Science and Technology, the crossroads of the three clinics, the courthouse, Dar El Beïda, the plateau Saint-Michel district, down town Oran, M'dina El Djadida, Boulanger and Es Senia.

Stations 

The stations are listed from the western suburbs to the eastern suburbs:

Rolling stock 
Service is provided by a fleet of 30 Alstom Citadis trams, each  in length.

Operation

The Oran Tramway is operated by Algeria's Société d'Exploitation des Tramway (Setram), a joint venture between the French state-owned RATP Dev (a subsidiary of RATP Group), Entreprise de transport urbain et suburbain d'Alger (ETUSA), and Entreprise Métro d'Alger (EMA), of which RATP Dev is a 49% shareholder, and mainly responsible for operating the Oran Tramway, as well as other trams in Algeria.

See also 
 List of town tramway systems in Africa
 List of tram and light rail transit systems

References 

Tram transport in Algeria
Tramway
RATP Group
2013 establishments in Algeria
Railway lines opened in 2013